The 2009 New Mexico State Aggies football team represented New Mexico State University as members of the Western Athletic Conference (WAC) in the 2009 NCAA Division I FBS football season. The Aggies were led by first–year head coach DeWayne Walker and played their home games at Aggie Memorial Stadium. They finished the season with a record of 3–10 overall and 1–7 in WAC play to tie for eighth place.

Schedule

References

New Mexico State
New Mexico State Aggies football seasons
New Mexico State Aggies football